Arutperunjothi is a 1971 Tamil language Indian biographical film of Ramalinga Swamigal (popularly known as Vallalar) directed by A. T. Krishnaswamy, starring Master Sridhar, A. P. Nagarajan, K. A. Thangavelu, M. Saroja, Devaki, T. S. Balaiah. It was released on 5 June 1971.

Cast
 Master Sridhar
 A. P. Nagarajan
 K. A. Thangavelu
 M. Saroja
 Devaki
 T. S. Balaiah
 Ennathe Kannaiah
 Pandari Bai

Soundtrack
The film's music is composed by T. R. Pappa. All the lyrics are composed by Ramalinga Swamigal.
Playback singers are Sirkazhi Govindarajan, S. Janaki, T. V. Rathnam
 Arutperunjothi arutperunjothi (Title Song)
 Thiruvonki punniya seyyalonki thanvarul thiralonki selvamoonka
 Neerundu poligindra kaarundu vilaikindra 
 Seergonda theiva vathanangal aarum 
 Allutha pillaikei paal unavalipal
 Pettra thaai thanai magha maranthaalum; pillaiyai perum thai maranthaalum
 Paarthalum ninaithalum padithalum padikka pakka nindru kettalum
 Varuvar alaithu vaadi
 Arutjothi theivamyenai aandukonda theivam

See also
 Ramalinga Swamigal
 Jothi Agaval
 Jothi (1939 film)

References

External links
 

1971 films
1970s Tamil-language films